Penitent Peak is a peak between Mount Breaker and Ryan Peak on Horseshoe Island. Surveyed by Falkland Islands Dependencies Survey (FIDS) in 1955-57 and so named because of the snow penitents which are a characteristic feature in the vicinity of the peak.

Mountains of Graham Land
Fallières Coast